Ogode is a village and a Gram panchayat of Nalgonda Mandal, Nalgonda district, in Telangana state, India.

References

Villages in Nalgonda district
ఒగోడు గ్రామం నల్గొండ జిల్లాలోనే చాలా ప్రత్యేకమైన గ్రామం. ఒకప్పుడు ఈ గ్రామం మూసినది ముంపు ప్రాంతలో ఉండేది.